Congenital estrogen deficiency is a congenital form of hypoestrogenism in which the body is unable to produce or use estrogens. Such conditions include:
 Aromatase deficiency, a condition in which aromatase is absent and androgens cannot be converted into estrogens.
 Estrogen insensitivity syndrome, a condition in which the estrogen receptor is defective and unable to respond to estrogens.

See also
 Aromatase excess syndrome
 Hyperestrogenism

References

External links 

Congenital disorders of endocrine system